("The Pietist") was a Swedish Christian monthly publication "for religious revival and edification", founded in January 1842 by the Scottish Methodist minister George Scott, who had immigrated to Sweden, and edited by preacher Carl Olof Rosenius until his death in 1868, after which the editorship was taken over by Paul Peter Waldenström. In the last years, the editorial staff included Janne Nyrén (1914–1915), Johan Peter Norberg (from 1916), Theodor Andersson (from 1917) and Jakob Emanuel Lundahl (1918). Around 10,000 copies of the journal were published between 1853 and 1865. The journal was for the Mission Friends but was spread widely: selections were copied, translated, and published freely at the time. A Finland-Swedish version entitled  ('The Evangelical Messenger') was also published. 

The word pietist, from the Latin word , meaning 'piety, godliness', refers to the Pietist movement.

During Rosenius' editorship, the magazine was essentially written by him, and was his main literary channel. In this way it had a great influence. His articles have subsequently been published as reflections and writings with a total circulation of two million, and another million in other languages, despite the fact that they are not particularly reader-friendly.

Rosenius and Waldenström contributed to the founding of Evangeliska Fosterlandsstiftelsen (EFS, the Swedish Evangelical Mission, 1856) and the Svenska Missionsförbundet (SMF, Swedish Mission Society, 1878), the former being a revivalist movement within the Church of Sweden, the latter a free church. This contradiction led the EFS, in reaction to the founding of the SMF, to reissue the first fifteen volumes under the title Pietisten. , which Rosenius had edited, while Pietisten under Waldenström became the official voice of the SMF in 1909 and was merged with the magazine Missionsförbundet in 1919.

Pietisten (1986–present)
A namesake journal, self-described as the "spiritual heir" of the original Pietisten, has been published in Minneapolis since its founding in 1986 by David Hawkinson and Peter Sandstrom.

References

External links 
 Pietisten, some volumes digitized by Project Runeberg 
 Pietisten, the English-language "spiritual heir" to the original Pietisten

Magazines published in Sweden
Christian magazines
Publications established in 1842
Pietism